Mohammad Farhan Adil, (born 25 September 1977) is a Pakistani former cricketer who played for the Pakistan national cricket team in his only test cricket match in 2003. He was a right-handed batsman and a right-arm offbreak bowler.

Adil has been associated with the middle-order of Karachi Cricket Association and Habib Bank for the last six years, and holds a steady first-class average in the mid-thirties. Having performed well during the Pakistan A tour of United Arab Emirates, he was picked for the Test squad, making his debut against Bangladesh in the third Test in 2003 he scored 33 in his two innings both times being dismissed by Mohammad Rafique. In the summer of 2007, Adil joined club side Chudleigh who play in the Devon Premier League.

1977 births
Living people
Pakistan Test cricketers
Pakistani cricketers
Karachi Whites cricketers
Habib Bank Limited cricketers
Karachi cricketers
Karachi Blues cricketers
Karachi Urban cricketers
Allied Bank Limited cricketers
Karachi Zebras cricketers
Pakistan Customs cricketers
Cricketers from Karachi